Igor Kravtšenko (born 28 March 1973) is an Estonian politician, representing the Estonian Centre Party. Kravtšenko first rose to the Riigikogu to substitute MP Rein Ratas in December 2016. He went on to act as a substitute until 14 September 2018, when Ratas formally left his seat for Kravtšenko. In Riigikogu, Kravtšenko has served in the Environment Committee from December 2016 to November 2017 and in the Social Affairs Committee since November 2017.

Kravtšenko took part in 2019 parliamentary election, but wasn't elected. However, as Mustamäe district elder Lauri Laats declined his seat in the Riigikogu, his mandate was passed on to Kravtšenko.

References

1973 births
21st-century Estonian politicians
Estonian Centre Party politicians
Estonian people of Ukrainian descent
Living people
Members of the Riigikogu, 2015–2019
Members of the Riigikogu, 2019–2023
Politicians from Tartu